Les chemins de ma maison  (meaning The Paths of My House) is the fourth French-language studio album by Canadian singer Celine Dion, released in Quebec, Canada on 7 September 1983. It includes the hit song, "Mon ami m'a quittée". The album topped the chart in Quebec, was certified Gold in Canada and won the Félix Award for Best Selling Album of the Year.

Content
Les chemins de ma maison includes ten songs, mainly co-written by Eddy Marnay, and produced by Marnay and René Angélil. 
"Ne me plaignez pas" is an adaptation of "Please Don't Sympathise" originally recorded by Sheena Easton, for which Marnay wrote French lyrics for this track.

Commercial performance
The album got Gold certification in Canada and has sold 100,000 copies. It reached number one in Quebec and stayed at the top of the chart for nine weeks. The first single "Mon ami m'a quittée" topped the Quebec charts for nine weeks.

Accolades

Les chemins de ma maison received a Félix Award for the Best Selling Album of the Year. Dion also won Félix Award for Female Vocalist of the Year and was nominated for Pop Album of the Year and Artist of the Year Achieving the Most Success Outside Quebec.

Track listing

Charts

Certifications and sales

|}

Release history

References

External links
 

1983 albums
Albums produced by Eddy Marnay
Celine Dion albums
Albums produced by René Angélil